The 2018 AFL Women's All-Australian team represents the best-performed players of the 2018 AFL Women's season. It was announced on 27 March 2018 as a complete women's Australian rules football team of 21 players, the first time that this happened after teams in the AFL Women's were reduced from 22 players following the competition's inaugural season. The team is honorary and does not play any games.

Initial squad
The initial 40-woman All-Australian squad was announced on 21 March.  and  had the most players selected in the initial squad with seven each, while grand finalists  and the  had six each. Twelve players from the 2017 team were among those selected.

Final team
The final team was announced on 27 March. Melbourne and grand finalists Brisbane and the Western Bulldogs had the most representatives with four each, and every team again had at least one representative. Nine players from the 2017 team were among those selected.  co-captain Chelsea Randall was announced as the All-Australian captain and Melbourne captain Daisy Pearce, the previous year's All-Australian captain, was announced as the vice-captain. 

Note: the position of coach in the AFL Women's All-Australian team is traditionally awarded to the coach of the premiership-winning team.

References

External links
 AFLW Awards

2018 AFL Women's season